Sergei Rachmaninoff's Sonata in G minor for Cello and Piano, Op. 19 was completed in November 1901 and published a year later.

Rachmaninoff regarded the role of the piano as not just an accompaniment but equal to the cello. Most of the themes are introduced by the piano, while they are embellished and expanded in the cello's part.

Premiere
Rachmaninoff dedicated the work to Anatoliy Brandukov, who gave the first performance in Moscow with the composer at the piano, on 2 December 1901. Rachmaninoff seems to have made some last-minute alterations after the premiere, as he wrote the date "12 December 1901" on the score.

Structure
As typical of sonatas in the Romantic period, it has four movements:
 Lento – Allegro moderato (G minor) 
 Allegro scherzando (C minor) 
 Andante (E-flat major) 
 Allegro mosso (G major)

The work takes approximately 35 minutes to perform.

Notable recordings 
1956 Daniil Shafran, Yakov Flier
1956 Zara Nelsova, Arthur Balsam
1958 Mstislav Rostropovich, Alexander Dedyukhin  (Repeat in the 1st movement is omitted)
1967 Paul Tortelier, Aldo Ciccolini
1984 Lynn Harrell, Vladimir Ashkenazy (Repeat in the 1st movement is omitted)
1990 Yo-Yo Ma, Emanuel Ax
1994 Truls Mørk, Jean-Yves Thibaudet
2002 Steven Isserlis, Stephen Hough
2004 Natalia Gutman, Eliso Virsaladze
2005 Mischa Maisky, Sergio Tiempo
2006 Gautier Capuçon, Gabriela Montero
2006 Alexander Kniazev, Nikolai Lugansky
2008 David Geringas, Ian Fountain
2012 Yuki Ito, Sofya Gulyak (Complete Rachmaninov Cello Works)
2012 Steven Doane, Barry Snyder
2012 Sol Gabetta, Olga Kern
2013 Julian Steckel, Paul Rivinius
2022 Jean-Guihen Queyras, Alexander Melnikov

Arrangement 
Arcadi Volodos transcribed the Andante of the work for piano solo and recorded it on Sony Classical.

References

External links 
 

Chamber music by Sergei Rachmaninoff
Rachmaninoff
1901 compositions
Compositions in G minor